The 1984–85 NBA season was the Knicks' 39th season in the NBA.

Bernard King injured his knee on March 25 and was put on injured reserve, ending his season. He was forced to sit out the next year. Before the injury, King scored 60 points in a Christmas Day game against the New Jersey Nets.

Draft picks

Roster

Regular season

Season standings

z - clinched division title
y - clinched division title
x - clinched playoff spot

Record vs. opponents

Game log

Player statistics

Awards and records

Transactions

See also
1984-85 NBA season

References

New York Knicks seasons
New
New York Knicks
New York Knicks
1980s in Manhattan
Madison Square Garden